Mervyn Richardson (born 7 January 1962) is a Trinidadian cricketer. He played in two first-class matches for Trinidad and Tobago in 1984/85 and 1985/86.

See also
 List of Trinidadian representative cricketers

References

External links
 

1962 births
Living people
Trinidad and Tobago cricketers